Isnaba Fidaiba Silva Graça (born 4 January 2002) is a Bissau-Guinean professional footballer who plays as a forward for the Under-23 squad of the Portuguese club Estrela da Amadora.

Career
Graça is a youth academy graduate of Leixões. He made his professional debut for the club on 4 December 2021 in a 1–0 league defeat against Porto B.

Career statistics

Club

References

External links
 

2002 births
Living people
Association football forwards
Bissau-Guinean footballers
Liga Portugal 2 players
Leixões S.C. players
Bissau-Guinean expatriate footballers
Bissau-Guinean expatriate sportspeople in Portugal
Expatriate footballers in Portugal